E234 may refer to:
 Nisin European E number
 European route E234